Johnny G. Economedes High School (JGHS), also known as Economedes or JEHS, is a public school in unincorporated Hidalgo County, Texas, USA, east of Edinburg. It is part of the Edinburg Consolidated Independent School District and is one of the district's four high schools. The school is named for former Edinburg Fire Chief Johnny G. "the Greek" Economedes.

Economedes serves sections of eastern and northeastern Edinburg along with several census-designated places: Cesar Chavez, Doolittle, and La Blanca.

Expansion to all district high schools in 2010 brought a new performing arts center to JEHS. It is simply called the Performing Arts Center, or PAC.

Education
The school is currently a TEA-Recognized campus because of its high STAAR scores. It is a second time finalist of the College Board Inspirational Award and an AVID National Demonstrated School.

References

External links
 

Buildings and structures in Edinburg, Texas
Edinburg Consolidated Independent School District high schools
Education in Edinburg, Texas